Ian Turner may refer to:

Ian Turner (Australian political activist) (1922–1978), Australian political activist and historian
Ian Turner (footballer, born 1953), English footballer for Grimsby Town, Southampton and Walsall
Ian Turner (Irish footballer) (born 1989), Irish footballer
Ian Turner (rower) (1925–2010), American rower
Ian Turner (cricketer) (born 1968), English cricketer
Ian Turner (rugby league) (born 1970), Australian businessman and rugby league footballer
Ian Turner (speedway rider) (born 1949), English speedway rider

See also
Iain Turner (born 1984), Scottish football goalkeeper for Everton